College GameDay or ESPN College GameDay may refer to one of several shows produced by the sports network, ESPN:
 College GameDay (football TV program), television program about college football, 1987–present
 College GameDay (basketball TV program), television program about college basketball, 2005–present
 ESPN Radio College GameDay, radio program about college football, 2000–present